The 2009 Air New Zealand Cup will be the Wellington Rugby Football Union's 4th consecutive participation in the competition. They are coming off a 2008 placing of 2nd. Last year Wellington lost the final 7–6 at Westpac Stadium. This was after Wellington had won their first nine games including beating Auckland for the Ranfurly Shield. Wellington then lost their final round game to Otago. Despite wins in the quarter and semi finals, Canterbury were too strong in the Grand Final. This was Wellington's 5th loss in a final in 6 years.

Jamie Joseph continued this season as the coach of Wellington. He selected Jacob Ellison as his captain along with a squad of 28 others. This squad did not include the All Blacks who would be available during various stages of the competition.

Currently, Wellington are fourth on the table after four rounds. So far they have successfully defended the Ranfurly Shield twice with their only loss coming away to Bay of Plenty Steamers.

Squad
Squad for the 2009 Air New Zealand Cup:

Note: The squad does largely not include All Blacks who will be available for some games during the season.

Pre-season

As Wellington held the Ranfurly Shield their pre season games would also double as Ranfurly Shield games. This is the only time that the shield is taken on the road. Both the Ranfurly Shield games were won.

Wellington 61 (Alipate Leiua 2, Daniel Kirkpatrick, David Smith, Charlie Ngatai, Shaun Treeby, Frae Wilson, Brendan Watt tries; Kirkpatrick 3 pen, 3 con, Fa'atonu Fili 3 con)Wanganui 6 (Denny Tyrell 2 pen). Halftime: 23–3. 

Wellington 90 (Tony Bradshaw 2, Jason Woodward 2, David Smith 2, Mark Reddish, Chris Middleton, Matthew Luamanu, Api Naikatini, Scott Fuglistaller, Marika Kau, Charlie Ngatai tries; Fa'atonu Fili 9 con, pen; Daniel Kirkpatrick 2 con) Wairarapa Bush 19 (Duncan Law, Joe Feast, Nick Olson tries; Byron Karaitiana 2 con). Halftime: 45–7. 

Two more further warm up games were played.

Regular season

This game was the Wellington Lion's first shield defence of 2009 in the Air New Zealand Cup. The game started poorly for them as Otago scored a first half try and led 11–3 at halftime. The 8-point lead was held until Wellington burst to life with 20 minutes to go, a good break was finished off by Daniel Ramsay and Hosea Gear beautifully went through the Otago defence. Wellington then led 20–14, a lead which was increased to 9 when Fa'atonu Fili dropped over a goal with about 10 minutes to go. Otago scored a late try but it was too late.

Early penalties were traded and then Wellington took the lead when winger Hosea Gear scored his second try of the season. Hawkes Bay however scored a converted try of their own through Sona Taumalolo which was then converted, this gave Hawkes Bay a 13-10 half time lead. In the second half a penalty and then a drop goal to replacement first five Fa'atonu Fili gave Wellington a 16–13 lead. This was Fili's second drop goal in as many weeks. A late David Smith try secured Wellington the 21–13 win. 

Before this game, Wellington's coach Jamie Joseph refused to pick his All Blacks players and forced them to play for Wellington B . This caused a massive controversy but 78% of Wellingtonians supported Joseph. A slow start cost Wellington in this game. Two first half tries from Corey Aporo gave Bay of Plenty a 21–6 lead at halftime. Wellington scored one try in the second half but it was not enough to give them victory. This was their first loss of the season. On the other hand, Bay of Plenty went top of the table as the only unbeaten side after three rounds.

This was Wellington's second Ranfurly Shield defence of the year and followed on from their opening loss of the season. At this stage, Auckland had had two bad losses at the start of the season but had beaten Northland the week before. Wellington immediately took control of the game and Wellington wing, Hosea Gear went over after just six minutes. The two teams both traded penalties early in the half and after that not another point was scored before halftime. John Schwalger crashed over for Wellington early in the second half but Auckland replacement first five Daniel Bowden hit back, making the score 13–8. Wellington first five Fa'atonu Fili slotted an important drop goal extending the lead held by Wellington to eight points. A converted try to Taniela Moa reduced the margin to just 1 point but it was enough. Wellington held on. This was the longest Wellington had held onto the Ranfurly Shield since 1953 and Fa'atonu Fili claimed the record for most drop goals in an Air New Zealand Cup season with 3.

Both Canterbury and Wellington had several All Blacks back for Wellington's 5th defence of the season. Wellington most notable had Cory Jane, Ma'a Nonu and Rodney So'oialo while Canterbury had All Black Captain Richie McCaw and fly half Dan Carter. Carter converted chances into points early on for Canterbury, racing out to a 9–0 lead. Tries tp George Whitelock and Tim Bateman gave Canterbury a mammoth 26–0 lead at half time. The lead only got bigger in the second half with another Dan Carter penalty and a converted try Corey Flynn. Hosea Gear and Ma'a Nonu both scored tries late in the match but by then the game was well over. Wellington defended the shield 5 times, the most since 1953. Canterbury got the shield for the first time since 2007.

Counties Manukau lacked the skill to compete with Wellington's big name players. The game was over at half time with the score 36–7. Hosea Gear scored four tries which kept him on top of the try scoring standings. Wellington went back into the top four with this win.

Statistics

Wellington have scored 169 points so far this season with an average of 24.1 points per game, and have also scored 19 tries throughout the season. Daniel Kirkpatrick leads the team in points with 49 points through his 7 games. Hosea Gear is the only player in the team to receive a disciplinary card, with a yellow against Hawke's Bay in round 2

Points

Tries

Goal Kicking

Disciplinary Cards

See also
 2009 Air New Zealand Cup

External links
Official site
Wellington Lions

Wellington Rugby Football Union
2009 Air New Zealand Cup

pl:Wellington Lions